is the Icelandic term for nationalism; nationmindedness is a rough translation of the term. Its use was instrumental in the Icelandic movement for independence from Denmark, led by Jón Sigurðsson.

These ideas are often encoded in the popular phrase  ('land, people, and language'). Historically, Icelanders have seen their current republic to be the reincarnation of the old Free State, and thus Icelandic nationalism today is based upon preserving what was gained by the independence movement. Thus Icelandic nationalist sentiment, having some aspects of civic and ethnic nationalism, is highly respectful of democratic parliamentary powers (see resurrected Althing) and skeptical of foreign control over Iceland, which is partly responsible for there being little will in Iceland for joining the European Union.

Icelandic nationalism primarily arose in the 19th century, during a time when it was under Danish hegemony. It arose not only due to pride in Iceland's achievements in the Middle Ages and a desire to embrace Icelandic cultural peculiarities, but also in reaction towards the increasing economic liberalism of the Danish government and thus a defense of Icelandic peasant life. One towering figure was Jón Sigurðsson, who was the preeminent figure of Icelandic nationalism in the 19th century and on whose birthday, 17 June 1944, the modern Icelandic republic intentionally declared independence.

List of Icelandic nationalist parties
 Icelandic National Front

References

 
Nationalism